Olivença Kulina is a Panoan language of Brazil (Fleck 2013).

The name "Pano Kulina" normally refers to the Kulina language of Curuça.

References

Panoan languages